Lucius Jefferson Barker (June 11, 1928 – June 21, 2020) was an American political scientist. He was the Edna Fischel Gellhorn Professor and chair of the political science department at Washington University in St. Louis, and then the William Bennett Munro Professor of Political Science at Stanford University. He was an influential scholar of constitutional law and civil liberties, as well as race and ethnic politics in the United States. He published works on civil liberties in the United States and systemic racism. He was also involved with several presidential campaigns, and he wrote books about the Jesse Jackson 1984 presidential campaign, for which he was a convention delegate.

Early life and education
Barker was born in Franklinton, Louisiana on June 11, 1928. He had five siblings.

Barker intended to study medicine while attending Southern University at Baton Rouge, where he obtained his bachelor's degree in political science in 1949. He decided to study political science after taking a class with Rodney Higgins. After graduating from Southern University in 1949, Barker earned a master's degree from the University of Illinois at Urbana Champaign in 1950, followed by a doctorate from the same institution four years later, where Jack Peltason was his advisor. He was the first Black teaching assistant in the College of Arts and Science at the University of Illinois at Urbana Champaign.

Career

Academic positions
After completing his PhD, Barker became a Fellow at the University of Illinois, and taught there for several years. He then returned to Southern University, followed by the University of Wisconsin–Milwaukee. In 1964, he was a Liberal Arts Fellow of Law and Political Science at the Harvard Law School. In 1967, Jack Peltason recruited Barker to return to the University of Illinois, where Peltason was chancellor and Barker was appointed assistant chancellor. In 1969, he joined the political science faculty at Washington University in St. Louis, where he became chair of the political science department, and was named the Edna Fischel Gellhorn Professor. In 1990, Barker moved to Stanford University, where he was appointed William Bennett Munro Professor of Political Science. He retired in 2006.

Barker was the 1992–1993 president of the American Political Science Association. He was the second Black president of the association; the first, 40 years before, had been Ralph Bunche. He was also the 1984 president of the Midwest Political Science Association. Barker was the founding editor of the National Review of Black Politics (then the National Political Science Review), a journal of the National Conference of Black Political Scientists.

Research
In addition to articles and chapters in edited volumes, Barker authored dozens of books. Several of these books have been described as foundational studies of topics in American politics. In 1970, Lucius Barker and his brother Twiley Barker coauthored the textbook Civil Liberties and the Constitution. This textbook had been published in 9 editions by 2020, and is considered a classic textbook on the structure of the American legal system. In 1980, he published Black Americans and the Political System (published in later editions as African Americans and the American Political System), which the American Political Science Association publication Political Science Now called "a defining book on systemic racism through a political lens". In 1984, he wrote a book on Jesse Jackson's presidential campaign, called Our time has come: A delegate's diary of Jesse Jackson's 1984 presidential campaign.

In this way, Barker's research activity was connected to civil rights and civil liberties activism. Our time has come was based on Barker's experience as a delegate for Jesse Jackson at the 1984 Democratic National Convention. Jackson called Barker "a scholarly soldier in our ongoing battle for equal rights".

Barker was also particularly noted for his teaching, and his students included Julián Castro, Joaquin Castro, Cory Booker, and Tony West.

Selected works
"Third Parties in Litigation: A Systemic View of the Judicial Function", The Journal of Politics (1967)
Civil Liberties and the Constitution, with Twiley Barker (1970)
African Americans and the American Political System, with Mack H. Jones and Katherine Tate (1980)
Our time has come: A delegate's diary of Jesse Jackson's 1984 presidential campaign (1984)
Jesse Jackson's 1984 presidential campaign: Challenge and change in American politics, with Ronald W. Walters (1989)

References

1928 births
2020 deaths
People from Franklinton, Louisiana
American political scientists
Southern University alumni
University of Illinois Urbana-Champaign alumni
University of Illinois Urbana-Champaign faculty
University of Wisconsin–Milwaukee faculty
Washington University in St. Louis faculty
Stanford University faculty
African-American political scientists
21st-century African-American people